"Lean On" is a song recorded by American electronic dance music group Major Lazer and French DJ and record producer DJ Snake featuring vocals from Danish singer MØ. It was released on March 2, 2015, as the lead single from Major Lazer's third studio album, Peace Is the Mission (2015). It was written by MØ, Diplo, William Grigahcine, Martin Bresso and Jr Blender, and produced by Major Lazer and DJ Snake. It is an EDM, electronic and moombahton song.

"Lean On" was a critical and commercial success, peaking at number four on the US Billboard Hot 100 and number two on the UK Singles Chart. It reached number one in several other countries including Argentina, Australia, Denmark, Finland, Ireland, the Netherlands, New Zealand, Mexico, and Switzerland; as well as the top 10 in Austria, Belgium, Canada, Colombia, France, Israel, Italy, Norway, Poland, Spain, and Sweden. In November 2015, "Lean On" was named by Spotify as the most streamed song of all time, and has over 1 billion streams globally as of June 2017; however, it was later overtaken by Drake's "One Dance" (2016).

The accompanying music video for "Lean On" was filmed in ND Studios, Karjat, Kaul Heritage City, in Vasai in Maharashtra, India and in the Golden Hall at Stockholm City Hall. The video premiered on March 23, 2015, and has over 3.27 billion views on YouTube as of October 2022. According to IFPI, "Lean On" was the fifth best-selling song of 2015 worldwide, and one of the best-selling singles of all time, with global sales of 13.1 million.

Background
Regarding the creative process behind "Lean On", producer Diplo of Major Lazer said, "We wrote this song with MØ very early from an instrumental Jr Blender created in some sessions in Trinidad. It was a strong hook. Very big to me but the production was lacking an attitude we needed. A year later I remixed the song at a completely different tempo and asked DJ Snake for a signature post chorus. After he did his thing, me, MØ and Blender rewrote the song at the new tempo in Las Vegas and made something very unique that became our album's lead-off single. We're super proud of this song." Diplo offered a slower reggae arrangement of the song to Rihanna, who rejected it. He also offered said arrangement of the song to Nicki Minaj, who turned it down as well. Diplo called this turn of events "a blessing in disguise". MØ sounds better than anybody was going to sound on that record."

Critical reception
The song has received critical acclaim. Brennan Carley of Spin wrote, "It's as if No Doubt met the C+C Music Factory". Consequence of Sounds Michelle Geslani called the song a "bouncy banger" and complimented MØ's "siren-like" vocals. David Jeffries from AllMusic praised MØ and DJ Snake for helping the track "deliver the sentimental lyrics and sensual house music at an intoxicating half-speed tempo." Billboard'''s Matt Medved praised the song, explaining, "Lean On" gives Major Lazer’s reggae, trap and moombahton blend a pop gloss. Already a festival favorite, it looks primed to follow Jack Ü and Justin Bieber's "Where Are Ü Now" as another Diplo product that both innovates and finds crossover appeal."Rolling Stone ranked "Lean On" at number 48 on its year-end list to find the 50 best songs of 2015, while Billboard listed it number one on its Top 10 Dance/Electronic songs of 2015. The latter magazine also ranked "Lean On" at number 3 on its year-end critics' poll for 2015: "The Grammys got it wrong. It's rare that a dance record of this quality reaches this level of ubiquity—after all, this is Spotifys most streamed song of all-time as of Nov. 2015. Despite being independently released, the infectious three-minute single became the poster child for dance crossover, dominating both radio and festival play and hitting No. 4 on the Hot 100. By Billboard's measure, 'Lean On' was the dance/electronic song of the year." The prestigious Village Voice ranked "Lean On" at number 25 on their annual year-end critic's poll. On January 26, 2016, "Lean On" reached #3 on Triple J's Hottest 100 of 2015.

Commercial performance
"Lean On" was a global commercial success. In the United States, "Lean On" debuted at the bottom of the Billboard Hot 100 on the issue dated April 25, 2015. The song later reached number four on August 29, 2015, spending 10 consecutive weeks in the top-10. This entry makes it Major Lazer and MØs highest-charting hit in the country at the time making Major Lazer's first top 10 and top 40, also making MØ's first top 10 and second top 40 ("Cold Water", a collaboration with Justin Bieber, reached number two in 2016); "Lean On" also ties with DJ Snakes "Turn Down for What", which also reached number four in June 2014.

In the United Kingdom, "Lean On" debuted at number 38 on the UK Singles Chart on the week ending April 11, 2015. The song entered the top-10 three weeks later, before reaching number two on June 27, 2015. The song spent 12 non-consecutive weeks in the top-10, becoming one of the few songs during 2015 to spend more than 10 weeks in the top 10 (even above several number-one singles). Elsewhere, in Australia, Denmark, Finland, Hungary, Ireland, New Zealand, and Norway, "Lean On" reached number one. Additionally, the single reached number 3 on the Canadian Hot 100.

In November 2015, "Lean On" was announced to have overtaken "Thinking Out Loud" by Ed Sheeran as the most streamed song of all time on Spotify, with 526 million streams globally. It currently has over 1 billion streams on the site, making it the fourth most streamed song.

 Music video 
The accompanying music video for "Lean On" was directed by Tim Erem, produced by Mikhail Mehra, Akshay Multani & Per Welen, director of photography Jacob Møller. It was shot at ND Studios, Karjat, and Kaul Heritage City, Vasai in Maharashtra, India. Some scenes of the video are filmed in the Golden Hall of the Stockholm City Hall. It follows a premise of Major Lazer, MØ and DJ Snake engaging in modernised Bollywood dance sequences. It was inspired by a previous tour Major Lazer embarked on in the country. Speaking about the music video, Major Lazer member Diplo said:
"When we toured there [in India] as Major Lazer, it was mind-blowing to see our fan-base and we wanted to incorporate the attitude and positive vibes into our video and just do something that embodies the essence of Major Lazer. Major Lazer has always been a culture mashup and to us, India feels like some kind of special creature with one foot in history and one firmly in the future."The video premiered on March 22, 2015, and has over 3 billion views on YouTube, making it the 26th most viewed video on the site.

Remixes
On July 10, 2015, the official EP of remixes was released for digital download. The EP consists of seven remixes.

Ty Dolla Sign remix
The official remix of "Lean On" features a guest appearance by American singer Ty Dolla Sign. It was premiered through Major Lazer's SoundCloud on June 17, 2015. Ty Dolla Sign starts the remix with his new verse while the rest of the song is the same as in the original version.

The remix was well received by music critics. Zach Frydenlund of Complex wrote; "While the song was already catchy as hell, Ty Dolla adds another element to the single". Rap-Up also gave a positive review to the remix with writing that Ty Dolla Sign starts the song with "electrifying verse that is guaranteed to get you lit". Elias Leight of The Fader'' wrote that Ty Dolla Sign added "some extra juice" to the song with his verse.

Track listing

Charts

Weekly charts

Year-end charts

Decade-end charts

Certifications

Release history

See also 
 List of best-selling singles in Australia
 List of most-viewed YouTube videos

References

2015 singles
2015 songs
Moombahton songs
DJ Snake songs
MØ songs
Dutch Top 40 number-one singles
Irish Singles Chart number-one singles
Major Lazer songs
Number-one singles in Australia
Number-one singles in Denmark
Number-one singles in Finland
Number-one singles in Greece
Number-one singles in Iceland
Number-one singles in Russia
Songs written by Diplo
Because Music singles
Songs written by MØ
Songs written by DJ Snake
Songs written by Jr Blender
Farruko songs